is a town located in Sen'nan District, Osaka Prefecture, Japan. , the town had an estimated population of 43,154 in 18377 households and a population density of 2500 persons per km2.

Geography 
Kumatori is located 30 kilometers from central Osaka, in the southern part of Osaka Prefecture, east of Izumisano City, where Kansai International Airport is located. The town is roughly in the shape of a leaf, about 4.8 kilometers east-west and 7.8 kilometers north-south.
The eastern part is the foothills of the Izumi Mountains, and the ground is gradually lower from the southeast toward the northwest. The Mide, Uyama, and Sumiyoshi rivers that originate in the Izumi Mountains flow through the central part of the town towards Osaka Bay.

Neighboring municipalities 
 Izumisano
 Kaizuka

Climate
Kumatori has a Humid subtropical climate (Köppen Cfa) characterized by warm summers and cool winters with light to no snowfall.

Demographics
Per Japanese census data, the population of Kumatori has been increasing over the past century.

History
The area of the modern town of Kumatori was within ancient Izumi Province. As a place name, "Kumatori" appears in the ancient Nihon Kōki as a place where Emperor Kanmu went hunting in 804 AD. In the Kamakura period, the area was part of a landed estate called "Kumatori-no-shō".  During the Edo Period, the area was largely under the control of Kishiwada Domain. The village Kumatori was established within Hine District with the creation of the modern municipalities system on April 1, 1889. On  April 1, 1896, the area became part of Sennan District, Osaka. Kumatori was elevated to town status on November 3, 195.1

Government
Kumatori has a mayor-council form of government with a directly elected mayor and a unicameral city council of 14 members. Kumatori collectively with the cities of Kaizuka, Sennan, Hannan and the minor municipalities of Sen'nan District contributes two members to the Osaka Prefectural Assembly. In terms of national politics, the town is part of Osaka 19th district of the lower house of the Diet of Japan.

Economy
Since then Meiji period, Kumatori has been noted for its production of textiles, notably cotton cloth. Agriculture and horticulture also play major roles in the local economy. In exchange for hosting Kyoto University's Institute for Integrated Radiation and Nuclear Science, the government agreed to make Kumatori Station on the Hanwa Line a stop for express trains, which has contributed to large-scale residential land development  and a rapid increase in population since 1963.

Education

Universities and colleges 
 Osaka University of Health and Sport Sciences
 Osaka University of Tourism
 Kyoto University's Institute for Integrated Radiation and Nuclear Science is located in Kumatori.

Primary and secondary education
Kumatori has five public elementary schools and three public middle schools operated by the town government, and one public combined middle/high school operated by the Osaka Prefectural Board of Education.

Transportation

Railways
 JR West – Hanwa Line

Highways

Local attractions
Okuyama-Ameyama Nature Park

Sister city relations 
 Mildura, Victoria, Australia

Notable people from Kumatori 
 Toru Murata, baseball player
 Sei Muroya, football player
 Yuhei Nakaushiro, baseball player

References

External links

Kumatori official website 

Towns in Osaka Prefecture
Kumatori, Osaka